QDF may stand for:

Quality Discrimination Filter, a sneaky censorship method used by Twitter

File extensions
 Financial data format used by Quicken personal finance software for Windows (Quicken Data File)

Mathematics
 Quadratic Differential Form